Quinta Grande, created on 24July 1848, is one of the five civil parishes that constitute the municipality of Câmara de Lobos in the archipelago of Madeira, Portugal.

Geography
Quinta Grande is situated within a river-valley and buttressed between the parishes of Campanário and Câmara de Lobos in the southwest coast of the island. The southeast part of the parish (along the coast) comprises Cabo Girão, a high escarpment and sheer cliff face. The residential and commercial buildings of this parish are located primarily along the river course, and, with forest, natural vegetation and terraced fields occupying the interior of the parish. The western part of the parish, although occupied by homes is a forested ridge and the eastern ridge is occupied by communication towers, radio and television facilities. Some vineyards and farmlands surround the parish to the north and east, and mostly concentrate on the cultivation of grapes for the production of Madeira Wine.

References

Parishes of Câmara de Lobos